The Solihull Metropolitan Borough Council elections were held on Thursday, 2 May 1996, with one third of the council to be elected. The council remained under no overall control, with the Conservatives and Independent Ratepayer and Residents no longer holding enough seats to continue their coalition. Voter turnout was 35.4%.

Election result

|- style="background-color:#F9F9F9"
! style="background-color: " |
| Independent Ratepayers & Residents 
| align="right" | 2
| align="right" | 0
| align="right" | 0
| align="right" | 0
| align="right" | 11.8
| align="right" | 8.0
| align="right" | 4,419
| align="right" | +1.6%
|-

This result had the following consequences for the total number of seats on the council after the elections:

Ward results

|- style="background-color:#F6F6F6"
! style="background-color: " |
| colspan="2"   | Independent Ratepayers hold 
| align="right" | Swing
| align="right" | +3.5
|-

|- style="background-color:#F6F6F6"
! style="background-color: " |
| colspan="2"   | Independent Ratepayers hold 
| align="right" | Swing
| align="right" | +11.0
|-

By-elections between 1996 and 1998

References

1996 English local elections
1996
1990s in the West Midlands (county)